Winand Kiran Madhankumar Bechan (born 12 September 1982), simply known as Kiran Bechan, is a Dutch former professional footballer who played as a midfielder.

Club career
Bechan was a product of the Ajax football academy, which he joined at under-13 level, and made his senior debut as a starter on 1 April 2001 against NEC under head coach Co Adriaanse. He did not make the grade at Ajax and was loaned to Sparta in January 2003, only to be recalled by Ajax and sold to FC Groningen in November 2004. He was then sent on loan to FC Den Bosch in summer 2006, and in summer 2007 Bechan was released by Groningen and moved abroad to join Spanish side Hércules Alicante. There, his contract was eventually cancelled by mutual consent. He then returned to the Netherlands to play for Eerste Divisie club Emmen.

He tried his luck abroad once more when he joined Ermis Aradippou of Cyprus and he had a season at Muaither in Qatar. He then played for Kazakh side Atyrau, where he was joined by fellow Dutch player Sylvano Comvalius. Bechan received an offer in January 2012 from Macedonian club Vardar, but due to the lack of financial guarantees, he was unable to reach an agreement with the club. He then went on trial with Fujian Smart Hero in China alongside Comvalius, but during practice with the team he suffered a torn meniscus, keeping him sidelined for months. In April 2012, Major League Soccer club San Jose Earthquakes showed interest, but due to a knee injury, he was unable to travel to the United States for a medical examination. In December 2012, Bechan announced his retirement from football at age 30.

Personal life
Bechan is Indo-Surinamese. After retiring from professional football, he moved to Almere, where he plays futsal at amateur level.

References

External links
 Profile at VI.nl 
 Profile at Ronald Zwiers 

1982 births
Living people
Footballers from Amsterdam
Dutch footballers
Association football midfielders
AFC Ajax players
Sparta Rotterdam players
FC Groningen players
FC Den Bosch players
Hércules CF players
FC Emmen players
Ermis Aradippou FC players
Muaither SC players
FC Atyrau players
Eredivisie players
Eerste Divisie players
Segunda División players
Cypriot First Division players
Kazakhstan Premier League players
Dutch expatriate footballers
Expatriate footballers in Spain
Expatriate footballers in Cyprus
Expatriate footballers in Qatar
Expatriate footballers in Kazakhstan
Dutch expatriate sportspeople in Spain
Dutch expatriate sportspeople in Cyprus
Dutch expatriate sportspeople in Qatar
Dutch expatriate sportspeople in Kazakhstan
Qatari Second Division players
Surinamese people of Indian descent
Surinamese Hindus
Dutch Hindus